Talihina (pronounced "tah-luh-HEE-nuh") is a town in LeFlore County, Oklahoma, United States, its name originating from two Choctaw words, tully and hena, meaning iron road. Iron road is reference to the railroad that the town was built around. It is part of the Fort Smith, Arkansas–Oklahoma Metropolitan Statistical Area. The population was 1,114 at the 2010 census, a loss of 8.0 percent from 1,211 at the 2000 census.

History
The community was founded as a station stop on the St. Louis and San Francisco Railroad, which opened through the Indian Territory in June 1887. A post office opened at Talihina, Indian Territory on November 30, 1887.  Talihina is the Choctaw Indian word for "railroad."

At the time of its founding, Talihina was located in Wade County, a part of the Apukshunnubbee District of the Choctaw Nation.

The railroad opened the surrounding area to ship cattle, timber, and cotton to Eastern markets and facilitated growth of the town. When Talihina incorporated in 1905, the town claimed a population of 400. Two major hospitals, the Choctaw-Chickasaw Tuberculosis Sanatorium and the Eastern Oklahoma State Tuberculosis Sanatorium, were built here between 1915 and 1921. By 1920, the population had grown to 690.

Tourism and recreation have been a major economic stimulus since the 1920s. Six lakes have been built in the Kiamichi Valley, attracting sportsmen and campers. This is the western end of the Talimena Scenic Drive, which runs to Mena, Arkansas and attracts many people to view the fall foliage.

The Choctaw Nation Health Center was constructed in Talihina in 1999.

Geography
Talihina is located at  (34.751602, −95.041207).

Demographics

As of the census of 2000, there were 1,211 people, 463 households, and 292 families residing in the town. The racial makeup of the town was 54.75% White, 1.07% African American, 37.16% Native American, 0.08% Asian, 0.17% from other races, and 6.77% from two or more races. Hispanic or Latino of any race were 1.16% of the population.

There were 463 households, out of which 30.5% had children under the age of 18 living with them, 40.8% were married couples living together, 16.0% had a female householder with no husband present, and 36.9% were non-families. 33.3% of all households were made up of individuals, and 17.7% had someone living alone who was 65 years of age or older. The average household size was 2.50 and the average family size was 3.21.

In the town, the population was spread out, with 29.4% under the age of 18, 8.1% from 18 to 24, 22.0% from 25 to 44, 20.4% from 45 to 64, and 20.1% who were 65 years of age or older. The median age was 38 years. For every 100 females, there were 88.9 males. For every 100 females age 18 and over, there were 83.5 males.

The median income for a household in the town was $20,875, and the median income for a family was $25,761. Males had a median income of $19,688 versus $17,216 for females. The per capita income for the town was $10,405. About 23.7% of families and 29.2% of the population were below the poverty line, including 42.7% of those under age 18 and 13.1% of those age 65 or over.

Points of interest
 Kerr Arboretum and Botanical Area
 Talimena Scenic Drive
 Lake Carl Albert, to the northwest of town.

Notable people
Bob Neighbors, Major League Baseball player killed in the Korean War, born in Talihina.
Lane Adams, who plays for the Atlanta Braves, was born in Talihina.
JD McPherson Rockabilly singer, songwriter and musician
Shawn Pittman, blues rock singer and songwriter

In popular culture
The song Talihina Sky by Kings of Leon was featured as a hidden track on the band's 2003 debut album, Youth and Young Manhood. The three brothers and cousin who comprise the band Kings of Leon have roots in Talihina, along with Nashville, Tennessee. "Talihina Sky" also became the name of their DVD documentary, about their upbringing, featuring the annual Followill Talihina reunion.

References

External links

 http://www.talihinacc.com
 Talihina Public Library
 Talihina Main Street
 Choctaw Nation Health Services Authority
 Oklahoma Digital Maps: Digital Collections of Oklahoma and Indian Territory

Towns in LeFlore County, Oklahoma
Towns in Oklahoma
Fort Smith metropolitan area